Sushi is a Japanese food made out of vinegared rice.

Sushi may also refer to:
Su Shi (1037–1101), Chinese poet
Sushi (software), a file previewer for the GNOME Desktop Environment
Sushi (wrestler), Japanese professional wrestler Akira Kawabata
 SUSHI (NISO Standard) (Standardized Usage Statistics Harvesting Initiative), a protocol for collecting library usage data
Sushi, a protein domain found on the protein Apolipoprotein H
Sushi (EP), an EP by Neuroticfish
 Sushi (album)

See also
 Suchi (disambiguation)